This is a list of members who were elected to the 31st Dáil Éireann, the lower house of the Oireachtas (legislature) of Ireland. These TDs (Members of Parliament) were elected at the 2011 general election on 25 February 2011. On the advice of President Mary McAleese, the newly elected Dáil Éireann convened at midday on 9 March 2011 in Leinster House. It was dissolved by President Michael D. Higgins on the request of Taoiseach Enda Kenny on 3 February 2016.

The 2011 election saw 17 Dáil constituencies return 3 TDs each, 15 constituencies return 4 TDs each and 11 constituencies return 5 TDs each, for a total of 166. Seán Barrett was elected as Ceann Comhairle in the first sitting of the Dáil. Fine Gael, led by Enda Kenny, became the largest party for the first time, though without an overall majority. Fine Gael formed a coalition government with the Labour Party, led by Eamon Gilmore, who had achieved their highest number of seats in the party's history. In July 2014, Joan Burton won a Labour Party leadership election to become the Leader of the Labour Party and Tánaiste.

Fianna Fáil secured 20 seats, the lowest in the party's history, and was the largest party in opposition. The leader of the party, Micheál Martin became the Leader of the Opposition. Gerry Adams as leader of Sinn Féin became the second opposition leader. A technical group was formed following the election composed of 16 independent politicians and members of the United Left Alliance, who failed to win enough seats to gain speaking rights.

Almost half of the members of the 30th Dáil were absent from the 31st: 31 members retired before the poll and a further 45 sitting TDs lost their seats at the election. 76 new TDs were elected to the Dáil, 46% of the total. The 31st Dáil lasted  days.

Composition of the 31st Dáil

Government coalition parties denoted with bullets

Graphical representation
The following illustrates the composition of the 31st Dáil at the time of its first sitting on 9 March 2011 (after Seán Barrett (Fine Gael) took office as Ceann Comhairle).

The following illustrates the composition at the time of its dissolution in February 2016.

Government
 Fine Gael 
 Labour Party 
Opposition
 Fianna Fáil 
 Sinn Féin 
 Anti-Austerity Alliance–People Before Profit
 Anti-Austerity Alliance
 Socialist Party
 People Before Profit Alliance
 Renua Ireland 
 Social Democrats
 Workers and Unemployed Action Group (later Workers and Unemployed Action)
 Independent
 Vacant seat

Notes
The Socialist Party, People Before Profit Alliance, Workers and Unemployed Action Group and some Independent politicians in Irelands sat together as a technical group, which was later joined by Renua Ireland and the Social Democrats.
This is not the official seating plan of the Dáil Éireann. The government parties sit to the left of the Ceann Comhairle and opposition parties sit to the right.

Ceann Comhairle
On 9 March 2011, Seán Barrett (FG) was proposed by Enda Kenny for the position of Ceann Comhairle. He was approved without a vote.

 Leas-Cheann Comhairle: Michael Kitt (Fianna Fáil)

Leadership

Government
 Taoiseach and Leader of Fine Gael: Enda Kenny
 Government Chief Whip and Fine Gael Chief whip: Paul Kehoe
 Tánaiste and Leader of the Labour Party: Joan Burton
 Labour Party Chief whip: Emmet Stagg

Opposition
 Leader of the Opposition and Leader of Fianna Fáil: Micheál Martin
 Fianna Fáil Chief whip: Seán Ó Fearghaíl
 Leader of Sinn Féin: Gerry Adams
 Sinn Féin Chief Whip: Aengus Ó Snodaigh

Committees
 Chairman of the Oireachtas Joint Committee on Agriculture, Food and the Marine: Andrew Doyle (Fine Gael)
 Vice Chairman of the Oireachtas Joint Committee on Agriculture, Food and the Marine: Pat Deering (Fine Gael)
 Chairwoman of the Oireachtas Joint Committee on Education and Social Protection: Joanna Tuffy (Labour Party)
 Vice Chairman of the Oireachtas Joint Committee on Education and Social Protection: Aodhán Ó Ríordáin (Labour Party)
 Chairman of the Oireachtas Joint Committee on Environment, Culture and the Gaeltacht: Michael McCarthy (Labour Party)
 Vice Chairman of the Oireachtas Joint Committee on Environment, Culture and the Gaeltacht: Noel Coonan (Fine Gael)
 Chairman of the Oireachtas Joint Committee on European Affairs: Dominic Hannigan (Labour Party)
 Vice Chairman of the Oireachtas Joint Committee on European Affairs: Dara Murphy (Fine Gael)
 Chairman of the Oireachtas Joint Committee on Finance, Public Expenditure and Reform: Ciarán Lynch (Labour Party)
 Vice Chairman of the Oireachtas Joint Committee on Finance, Public Expenditure and Reform: Liam Twomey (Fine Gael)
 Chairman of the Oireachtas Joint Committee on Foreign Affairs and Trade: Pat Breen (Fine Gael)
 Vice Chairman of the Oireachtas Joint Committee on Foreign Affairs and Trade: Bernard Durkan (Fine Gael)
 Chairman of the Oireachtas Joint Committee on Health and Children: Jerry Buttimer (Fine Gael)
 Vice Chairman of the Oireachtas Joint Committee on Health and Children: Ciara Conway (Labour Party)
 Chairman of the Oireachtas Joint Committee on the Implementation of the Good Friday Agreement: Joe McHugh (Fine Gael)
 Vice Chairman of the Oireachtas Joint Committee on the Implementation of the Good Friday Agreement: Joe O'Reilly (Fine Gael)
 Chairman of the Oireachtas Joint Committee of Inquiry: Ciarán Lynch (Labour Party)
 Chairman of the Oireachtas Joint Committee on Public Service Oversight and Petitions: Pádraig Mac Lochlainn (Sinn Féin)
 Vice Chairman of the Oireachtas Joint Committee on Public Service Oversight and Petitions: Derek Nolan (Labour Party)
 Chairman of the Oireachtas Joint Committee on Jobs, Enterprise and Innovation: Damien English (Fine Gael)
 Vice Chairman of the Oireachtas Joint Committee on Jobs, Enterprise and Innovation: John Lyons (Labour Party)
 Chairman of the Oireachtas Select Committee on Members' Interests of Dáil Éireann: Thomas Pringle (Independent)
 Chairman of the Oireachtas Select Committee on Procedure and Privileges (Dáil): Seán Barrett (Fine Gael)
 Chairman of the Oireachtas Joint Sub-Committee on Administration: Joe Carey (Fine Gael)
 Chairman of the Oireachtas Sub-Committee on Dáil Reform: Paul Kehoe (Fine Gael)
 Chairman of the Oireachtas Sub-Committee on Privileges: Emmet Stagg (Labour Party)
 Chairman of the Oireachtas Public Accounts Committee: John McGuinness (Fianna Fáil)
 Vice Chairman of the Oireachtas Public Accounts Committee: Kieran O'Donnell (Fine Gael)
 Chairman of the Oireachtas Joint Committee on Transport and Communications: John O'Mahony (Fine Gael)
 Vice Chairman of the Oireachtas Joint Committee on Transport and Communications: Paudie Coffey (Fine Gael)
 Chairman of the Oireachtas Joint Committee on Standing Orders (Private Business): Denis O'Donovan (Fianna Fáil) – Senator

List of TDs  
This is a list of TDs elected to Dáil Éireann in the 2011 general election, sorted by party. Note this table is a record of the 2011 general election results. The Changes table below records all changes in party affiliation.

Changes

Retirements
The following members of the 31st Dáil did not stand for re-election to the 32nd Dáil.

See also
Members of the 24th Seanad

Notes

References

External links

Houses of the Oireachtas: Debates: 30th Dáil

 
31st Dáil
2011 in the Republic of Ireland
31